Neuer is a surname. Notable people with the surname include:

 Hillel Neuer (born 1969 or '70), Canadian lawyer and human rights activist
 Manuel Neuer (born 1986), German football goalkeeper
 Tacks Neuer (1877–1966), American baseball player

German-language surnames